The Day of Remembrance and Sorrow is a memorable date celebrated annually on 22 June in Russia, Belarus and Ukraine. It honors the anniversary of Operation Barbarossa, the Axis invasion of the Soviet Union during World War II. On 13 June. the Presidium of the Supreme Soviet of Russia declared that 22 June should be marked as the Remembrance Day for Defenders of the Fatherland. It was established by decree of President of Russia Boris Yeltsin on 8 June 1996.

Celebrations

On this day, national flags are lowered on the buildings of state institutions, ships of the Russian Navy. Flags with mourning ribbons are instead hung on residential buildings. All entertainment events and broadcasts on television and radio are canceled throughout the day. Commemorative events are held throughout the country, such as the laying flowers and wreaths at monuments honoring the Great Patriotic War. The President of Russia, the Prime Minister, the Chairman of the Federation Council, the Chairman of the State Duma, members of the Federal Assembly, and representatives of veteran organizations lay wreaths at the Tomb of the Unknown Soldier in the Alexander Garden.

The Candle of Remembrance campaign is another commonplace event (held annually since 2009). In 2015, former Soviet nations such as Kazakhstan, Armenia and Belarus had participated in the campaign. The annual open-air concert "Music of Peace Against War" is traditionally held in Krasnoyarsk. The Memory Watch campaign is another civilian event. The President Vladimir Putin took part in the opening ceremony of the campaign in 2019 national event at the Victory Museum on Moscow's Poklonnaya Gora. Since 2017, a demilitarized convoy of armored vehicles from the Moscow Garrison have driven from Moscow to the Belarusian capital of Minsk and returns to the Russian capital.

In 2020, Putin visited the newly opened Main Cathedral of the Russian Armed Forces on 22 June. The 2020 celebrations of the holiday were part of the two day reception for veterans that would conclude in 24 June with the Moscow Victory Day Parade.

In Belarus and Ukraine
22 June is celebrated in Belarus as the Day of the Nationwide Memory of the Victims of the Great Patriotic War and in Ukraine as the Day of mourning and Commemoration of the Memory of the Victims of the War. On the war's 80th anniversary, a commemorative ceremony at the Brest Fortress was held with the participation of the Belarusian military and the Ryazan Guards Higher Airborne Command School.

See also

Time of Remembrance and Reconciliation for Those Who Lost Their Lives during the Second World War
Anti-Fascist Struggle Day
Day of Remembrance of the Victims of Political Repressions
Victory Day (9 May)

References

Aftermath of World War II in the Soviet Union
Observances in Russia
Observances in Ukraine
Observances in Belarus
Operation Barbarossa
June observances